Whip Rush (ウィップラッシュ 惑星ボルテガスの謎) (or Whip Rush: Mystery of the planet Voltegas, Whip Rush 2222AD: The Invasion of the Voltegians) is a space-themed, horizontally and vertically scrolling shooter released in 1990 for the Mega Drive and later that year in North America for the Sega Genesis. There are different box covers for each, but the game is identical and plays in English in both regions.

Gameplay

Plot
In the 22nd century, mankind has drained every planet in the Solar System of its natural resources. Three Alpha-type robotic spaceships left the overpopulated Earth on a mission to find similar planets to colonize. After five years, the pilots reported finding a similar planet they learned was called Voltegeus, but upon approach their transmission was lost and the ships never re-established contact. Less than a week after the discovery, a massive alien vessel materialized in the vicinity of Mars and started attacking the Earth. Thankfully, Earth's smallest, but most powerful spaceship, the Whip Rush, is ready to attack. It is now up to the Whip Rush to stop the invasion of the Voltegians and discover what truly happened to the missing colony ships.

Reception

References

External links
Whip Rush at Sega Does
Review at Sega-16

1990 video games
Sega Genesis games
Sega Genesis-only games
Sega video games
Scrolling shooters
Vic Tokai games
Single-player video games
Science fiction video games
Video games set in the 22nd century
Video games developed in Japan